Zala  is a town and commune in the municipality of Nambuangongo, province of Bengo, Angola.

References

Populated places in Bengo Province
Communes in Bengo Province